David Alexander Stewart (May 23, 1874 – March 20, 1947) was a Canadian politician. He served in the Legislative Assembly of New Brunswick as member of the Progressive Conservative party representing Restigouche County.

References

1874 births
1947 deaths
Progressive Conservative Party of New Brunswick MLAs